Marie Uguay (April 22, 1955 – October 26, 1981) was a French Canadian poet from the province of Quebec.

She was born in the former town of Ville-Émard which has now become a district of the city of Montreal.

A victim of bone cancer, she had her right leg amputated at the age of 21 while she was still undergoing studies at the Université du Québec à Montréal in literature. She died at the age of 26, from cancer, on October 26, 1981.

A cultural center in Ville-Émard was named for Uguay after her death and is still open today, as well as a public library.

Childhood
She was born with the name Marie Lalonde but eventually borrowed her maternal grandfather's name in his honor. He was a violin teacher, an amateur of literature and she viewed him as a role model. She began writing very early, first writing stories for her pleasure. Soon she began writing poetry as she appreciated how full of life a text could become through poetic verses.

Work
Uguay's poetry is marked by her reflections on Québec separatism, the feminist movement, and on her illness. The critic Ben Libman has compared Uguay's prodigious brilliance to that of John Keats and Jules Laforgue, writing that "What astonishes about Uguay’s poetry, then, is not the maturity that, despite itself, is youthful but the youthfulness that, despite itself, is mature."

Bibliography

Original works
 Signe et rumeur (1976)
 L'Outre-vie (1979)
 Autoportraits (1982) (posthumous)
 Journal 2005 (posthumous)

Works translated into English
 Selected poems (1975-1981) (translated by Daniel Sloate)

References

1955 births
1981 deaths
20th-century Canadian poets
Canadian women poets
Writers from Montreal
French Quebecers
Canadian poets in French
Université du Québec à Montréal alumni
People from Le Sud-Ouest
20th-century Canadian women writers